Minimum orbit intersection distance (MOID) is a measure used in astronomy to assess potential close approaches and collision risks between astronomical objects.  It is defined as the distance between the closest points of the osculating orbits of two bodies.  Of greatest interest is the risk of a collision with Earth.  Earth MOID is often listed on comet and asteroid databases such as the JPL Small-Body Database.  MOID values are also defined with respect to other bodies as well: Jupiter MOID, Venus MOID and so on.

An object is classified as a potentially hazardous object (PHO) – that is, posing a possible risk to Earth – if, among other conditions, its Earth MOID is less than 0.05 AU.  For more massive bodies than Earth, there is a potentially notable close approach with a larger MOID; for instance, Jupiter MOIDs less than 1 AU are considered noteworthy since Jupiter is the most massive planet.

A low MOID does not mean that a collision is inevitable as the planets frequently perturb the orbit of small bodies. It is also necessary that the two bodies reach that point in their orbits at the same time before the smaller body is perturbed into a different orbit with a different MOID value. Two objects gravitationally locked in orbital resonance may never approach one another. Numerical integrations become increasingly divergent as trajectories are projected further forward in time, especially beyond times where the smaller body is repeatedly perturbed by other planets.  MOID has the convenience that it is obtained directly from the orbital elements of the body and no numerical integration into the future is used.

The only object that has ever been rated at 4 on the Torino Scale (since downgraded), the Aten asteroid (99942) Apophis, has an Earth MOID of 0.000316 AU.  This is not the smallest Earth MOID in the catalogues; many bodies with a small Earth MOID are not classed as PHO's because the objects are less than roughly 140 meters in diameter (or absolute magnitude, H > 22). Earth MOID values are generally more practical for asteroids less than 140 meters in diameter as those asteroids are very dim and often have a short observation arc with a poorly determined orbit. As of June 2022, there have been five objects detected and their Earth-MOID calculated before the Earth impact. The first two objects that were detected and had their Earth-MOID calculated before Earth impact were the small asteroids  and 2014 AA.  was listed with a MOID of 0.00001 AU in the Minor Planet Center database, and is the smallest MOID calculated for an Apollo asteroid. It is even smaller at the more precise JPL Small Body Database (0.0000078 AU).

See also
Asteroid impact prediction
List of Mercury-crossing minor planets
List of Venus-crossing minor planets
List of Earth-crossing minor planets
List of Mars-crossing minor planets
List of Jupiter-crossing minor planets
List of Saturn-crossing minor planets
List of Uranus-crossing minor planets
List of Neptune-crossing minor planets

References

External links 
 Fast Geometric Method for Calculating Accurate Minimum Orbit Intersection Distances (PDF) 
 MOID for all NEOs (Near-Earth Objects) for Mercury to Jupiter (Updated Daily)
 List of the Potentially Hazardous Asteroids (PHAs)
 MBPL - Minor Body Priority List ( PHA Asteroids )
 SAEL - Small Asteroids Encounters List

Near-Earth objects
Space hazards
Orbits
Astrodynamics